Sky Gate is a tower built in the heart of the Achrafieh District in Beirut. From its completion in 2014 until late 2016, Sky Gate was the tallest structure in Lebanon. The tower is composed of four superimposed block-like sections that accommodate 42 floors in an unconventional' design. Sky Gate is situated on the peak-point of Achrafieh, offering a 360 degree view of Beirut and Mount Lebanon. Tilal Beirut and the Atomium twin towers surround Sky Gate from both sides. This tower and others like it have been thoroughly criticized for their effect on the city as a whole, particularly in the manner in which they contribute to the loss of local built heritage and a steady increase in inflation

Concept 
Sky Gate is designed and executed by the Lebanese architect, Nabil Gholam. The project is composed of a high rise and a low rise structure that consist of 42 floors. Sky Gate is surrounded by an emporium of gardens and green areas, along with water features.

Features 

Sky Gate has the following features:
 Tallest fully residential building in Beirut with 42 floors with 3.5m ceiling heights;
 A health club and fitness center;
 Indoor and outdoor swimming pools, a sauna and steam rooms;
 360 degree views of the city, sea and surrounding mountains, especially from the upper floors;
 Landscaping  and water features occupying 3000m², with a unique running track in the gardens;
 State of the art amenities, including a fitness center as well as indoor and outdoor swimming pools;
 Parking lots for residents and guests, as well as a driver's room and storage for each apartment; and
 An advanced structure capable of withstanding severe earthquakes.

Accommodation Variety 

Throughout the High Rise bloc, the 42 floors of Sky Gate contain simplexes and duplexes that range from the following variety of areas:

Normal simplex apartments 
 224m²  
 3045m²  
 506m²

Duplex Apartments 
 750m²  
 788m² 
 847m²

Penthouses 
 750m²
 1,515m²

Honors 
Sky Gate has been honored as: 
 An international award at MIPIM for its distinguished design by Nabil Gholam Architecture and Planning;
 Peter Marino, a world renowned Architect and Interior Designer, has been retained as a consultant for materials selection and lobby design.

References 

Buildings and structures completed in 2014
Buildings and structures in Beirut
Apartment buildings